Radella railway station is the 62nd railway station on the Main Line, and is  away from Colombo. The station was opened in 1890.

The station has one platform and most trains including Podi Menike and Udarata Menike express trains service the station.

Continuity

Railway stations in Nuwara Eliya District
Railway stations on the Main Line (Sri Lanka)
Railway stations opened in 1890